Adamczyk is a Polish surname. Notable people with the surname include: 

 Adam Adamczyk (born 1950), Polish judoka
 Andrzej Adamczyk (born 1959), Polish politician
 Bogdan Adamczyk (born 1935), Polish football player
 Darius Adamczyk (born 1965/66), American businessman, CEO of Honeywell
 Edward Adamczyk (1921–1993), Polish athlete
 Hubert Adamczyk, Polish football player
 Karolina Adamczyk (born 1975), Polish actress
 Krzysztof Adamczyk (born 1956), Polish football player
 Marzenna Adamczyk (born 1956), Polish translator, diplomat
 Matt Adamczyk (born 1978), American businessman and politician
 Mirosław Adamczyk (born 1962), Polish bishop and Vatican diplomat 
 Patryk Adamczyk (born 1994), Polish athlete
 Piotr Adamczyk (born 1972), Polish actor
 Roman Adamczyk (1925–1988), Polish football player
 Vyacheslav Adamczyk (born 1933), Belarusian journalist, writer, playwright and screenwriter
 Waldemar Adamczyk (born 1969), Polish football player
 Zygmunt Adamczyk (1923–1985), Polish football player

See also

References

Polish-language surnames